In the mathematical field of order theory, an order isomorphism is a special kind of monotone function that constitutes a suitable notion of isomorphism for partially ordered sets (posets). Whenever two posets are order isomorphic, they can be considered to be "essentially the same" in the sense that either of the orders can be obtained from the other just by renaming of elements. Two strictly weaker notions that relate to order isomorphisms are order embeddings and Galois connections.

Definition
That is, it is a bijective order-embedding.

It is also possible to define an order isomorphism to be a surjective order-embedding.

Yet another characterization of order isomorphisms is that they are exactly the monotone bijections that have a monotone inverse.

An order isomorphism from a partially ordered set to itself is called an order automorphism.

Examples
 The identity function on any partially ordered set is always an order automorphism.
 The open interval  (again, ordered numerically) does not have an order isomorphism to or from the closed interval : the closed interval has a least element, but the open interval does not, and order isomorphisms must preserve the existence of least elements.
By Cantor's isomorphism theorem, every unbounded countable dense linear order is isomorphic to the ordering of the rational numbers. Explicit order isomorphisms between the quadratic algebraic numbers, the rational numbers, and the dyadic rational numbers are provided by Minkowski's question-mark function.

Order types
If  is an order isomorphism, then so is its inverse function.

Two partially ordered sets are said to be order isomorphic when there exists an order isomorphism from one to the other. Identity functions, function inverses, and compositions of functions correspond, respectively, to the three defining characteristics of an equivalence relation: reflexivity, symmetry, and transitivity. Therefore, order isomorphism is an equivalence relation. The class of partially ordered sets can be partitioned by it into equivalence classes, families of partially ordered sets that are all isomorphic to each other. These equivalence classes are called order types.

See also
Permutation pattern, a permutation that is order-isomorphic to a subsequence of another permutation

Notes

References
.
.
.
.

Morphisms
Order theory